Pomatias raricosta is a species of land snail with an operculum, a terrestrial gastropod mollusk in the family Pomatiidae. This species is endemic to Spain.
Endemic fauna of the Canary Islands

References

Pomatiidae
Endemic fauna of Spain
Gastropods described in 1878
Taxonomy articles created by Polbot